The WNBL Finals is the championship series of the Women's National Basketball League (WNBL).

Editions

Format

See also

NBL Finals

References

External links